Jack Hayes (born 30 March 1994) is an Australian field hockey player.

Personal life
Hayes grew up in Albion Park, New South Wales.

Hayes comes from a large sporting family, with cousins Casey Sablowski a former member of the Hockeyroos, and Ryan Gregson a 1500-metre record holder.

Career

Indoor National Team
In 2018, Hayes was a member of the Australian team at the 2018 Indoor World Cup, where the team finished in fourth place. Hayes was Australia's highest scorer, netting 9 goals throughout the campaign.

Senior National Team
After spending 3 years in the National Development Squad, Hayes was raised to the Kookaburras squad in November 2019.

Hayes made his debut for Australia in February 2019, in an FIH Pro League match against Germany in Hobart.

References

1994 births
Australian male field hockey players
Sportsmen from New South Wales
Male field hockey forwards
Living people
2018 FIH Indoor Hockey World Cup players